BUX is a European mobile brokerage company, based in Amsterdam and London. Retail investors buy shares, ETFs and cryptocurrency commission-free through the BUX Zero app. BUX allows users CFD trading through its BUX X app and crypto trading using the BUX Crypto platform.

History 
BUX was founded in July 2013 by Nick Bortot, a former executive at Dutch online broker BinckBank. The initial funding came from the founders and Orange Growth Capital.

The company launched its first BUX app in September 2014 in the Netherlands and several months later in the UK. It was based on CFD trading.

In September 2015, BUX raised  from the American/British venture investor Initial Capital. In February 2016, it raised another  from Holtzbrinck Ventures, and existing shareholders Orange Growth Capital and Velocity Capital. Also in February 2016, the app became available in Germany.

In 2016 the company won "Accenture Innovation Awards". Also Wired UK included the company into its "Europe's hottest startups 2016" list. In October 2016, the company removed the BUX app from app stores for Belgium just 1 month after launch, due to local law prohibiting the commercialization of leveraged CFDs.

In January 2017, the app was launched in Italy. In October 2017, the firm raised another  from two existing shareholders, Holtzbrinck Ventures and Velocity Capital Management, as well as from a number of private investors (such as Arthur Kosten, the former CMO of Booking.com, BinckBank founder Thierry Schaap and the CEO and founder of Mollie :nl:Adriaan Mol). BUX also launched a crowdfunding campaign on Seedrs, where it raised an additional .

By November 2018, the BUX app had 2 million users in 9 European countries.

In May 2019, BUX partnered with ABN AMRO to use the bank’s blockchain-based technology in its new zero-commission investing app.

In June 2019, the firm raised  in venture capital funds. Also in June 2019, the BUX app was renamed to BUX X.

In September 2019, a new app named BUX Zero, was launched in the Netherlands. In June 2020, it was launched in Germany and Austria and one month later in France. In August 2020, it became available in Belgium.

In January 2020, BUX acquired Blockport, a European cryptocurrency exchange. The firm registered it with the  Dutch Central Bank, rebranded and launched as BUX Crypto in April 2020.

Products 
The BUX Zero app, launched in September 2019, allows users to trade European and US stocks and exchange-traded funds at zero commission. Financial services are provided by BUX B.V. and regulated by the Netherlands Authority for the Financial Markets. As of October 2020, BUX Zero was available in the Netherlands, in Germany, Austria, France, and Belgium.

The revenue of the company is generated through € 1 commission on market and limit orders, however BUX invented a new order type, called the Zero order, which is free of charge. In the future, BUX will also generate revenue through securities lending, e.g. by lending out the shares held in custody against collateral. However, this service is not yet live. The statement by the company says "You have become a client of BUX and explicitly given approval for the lending of Your Financial Instruments. The aim of lending Your Financial Instruments is to achieve a return for BUX, make it possible to offer certain services free of charge and keep other costs as low as possible for You." 

BUX X, launched in September 2014, is an app for CFD trading, amidst criticism that CFD trading was too complicated and risky for consumers. The service is provided by BUX Financial Services Limited, regulated by the Financial Conduct Authority. As of September 2019, the app was available in the Netherlands, the UK, in Germany, Austria, Italy, Spain, France, Sweden and Denmark.

References

External links 
 

Bitcoin exchanges

Financial services companies of the Netherlands

Online brokerages
Companies based in Amsterdam
Financial services companies established in 2013
Dutch companies established in 2013